Robert Maloubier  (2 February 1923 – 20 April 2015) was a French secret agent who worked for the British Special Operations Executive (SOE) in World War II. He received his training at Wanborough Manor in Surrey. Following the war, Maloubier went on to become a founding member of the Service de Documentation Extérieure et de Contre-Espionnage. He also designed one of the world's first modern diving watches, when he saw the need for one that could be seen in muddy waters.

References

External links
 Imperial War Museum Interview

1923 births
2015 deaths
People from Neuilly-sur-Seine
French Special Operations Executive personnel
Members of the Order of the British Empire